is a Japanese footballer who plays for Giravanz Kitakyushu.

Club career
After several clubs for which he played for, Muramatsu retired in February 2019 after one season with Giravanz Kitakyushu.

National team career
In July 2012, he was elected Japan U-23 national team for 2012 Summer Olympics. At this tournament, he played 1 match as right side back against Honduras and Japan won the 4th place.

Club statistics
Updated to 23 February 2019.

1Includes Emperor's Cup.
2Includes J. League Cup.

National team statistics

Appearances in major competitions

References

External links

 
Profile at Shimizu S-Pulse 
Profile at Vissel Kobe
Profile at Giravanz Kitakyushu

1989 births
Living people
Association football people from Shizuoka Prefecture
Japanese footballers
J1 League players
J2 League players
J3 League players
Japan Football League players
Honda FC players
Shonan Bellmare players
Shimizu S-Pulse players
Tokushima Vortis players
Vissel Kobe players
Giravanz Kitakyushu players
Olympic footballers of Japan
Footballers at the 2012 Summer Olympics
People from Yaizu, Shizuoka
Association football defenders